"Girls Chase Boys" is the lead single from Ingrid Michaelson's sixth studio album, Lights Out. The song peaked at number 52 on the Billboard Hot 100.

Background
Michaelson spoke about the development of the song and stated,

It was written by Ingrid Michaelson, along with Trent Dabbs and Barry Dean.

Commercial performance
This song became Michaelson's highest-charting single and biggest airplay hit since "The Way I Am" hit number 37 in 2007, peaking at number 52 on the Billboard Hot 100, as well as her highest appearance on the Adult Pop Songs chart (number 6). It is also her first appearance on the magazine's Pop Songs chart, debuting at number 40 and reaching number 25. It reached number 38 on the Hot 100 Airplay (Radio Songs) chart, her first single to list on that chart.

Music video
The official music video for "Girls Chase Boys" was released on February 4, 2014. It is a homage to Robert Palmer's 1988 video for "Simply Irresistible", featuring different genders in the dancer roles instead of just women.

Charts

Weekly charts

Year-end charts

Certifications

References

2014 singles
2014 songs
Ingrid Michaelson songs
Songs written by Ingrid Michaelson
Songs written by Barry Dean (songwriter)
Bisexuality-related songs
Songs about cross-dressing